This is a list of the Great Britain Davis Cup team results since 1981, when the competition started being held in the current World Group format.

Results

References 

Great Britain national tennis team
Tennis in the United Kingdom